Weeder Rock is a small isolated coastal rock located 6 nautical miles (11 km) north-northwest of Mount Belolikov. It rises above the smooth, ice-covered peninsula between the mouths of Rennick and Gannutz Glaciers. Mapped by United States Geological Survey (USGS) from surveys and U.S. Navy air photos, 1960–64. Named by Advisory Committee on Antarctic Names (US-ACAN) for Courtland C. Weeder, U.S. Navy, storekeeper with the South Pole Station winter party, 1965.

Rock formations of Victoria Land
Pennell Coast